Michael Stegmeier (born 12 January 1985) is a German former professional footballer who played as a defender.

Club career
His former clubs are SSV Ulm, SV Altenberg (Dillingen), Bayern Munich II, VfL Wolfsburg, Carl Zeiss Jena and VfR Aalen. In the 2009–10 season, Stegmayer was with FC Vaduz.

Stegmayer has appeared in 11 Bundesliga matches for VfL Wolfsburg.

International career
Stegmayer played more than 40 games in different German Football Association-youth teams.

Career statistics

Honours
Bayern Munich II
IFA Shield: 2005

External links

References

1985 births
Living people
Association football defenders
German footballers
Footballers from Baden-Württemberg
Germany youth international footballers
FC Bayern Munich II players
SSV Ulm 1846 players
Expatriate footballers in Liechtenstein
VfL Wolfsburg players
FC Carl Zeiss Jena players
VfR Aalen players
FC Vaduz players
German expatriate sportspeople in Liechtenstein
German expatriate footballers
SpVgg Unterhaching players
SV Darmstadt 98 players
Bundesliga players
2. Bundesliga players
3. Liga players